The 2009–10 Serbian SuperLiga (known as the Jelen SuperLiga for sponsorship reasons) is the fourth season of the SuperLiga since its establishment in 2006. It began on 15 August 2009 and ended on 16 May 2010. A total of sixteen teams contest the league, with Partizan the defending champions.

Changes from the 2008–09 season

Structure changes
League size was expanded from twelve to sixteen teams prior to this season. As a consequence, the schedule for each team was reduced from 33 to 30 matches.

Team changes
Due to the league expansion, only 12th-placed Banat Zrenjanin were relegated to the First League. They were replaced by the 2008–09 First League champions BSK Borča. The other four teams achieving promotion were (in order of their finish) FK Smederevo, Mladi Radnik, Spartak Zlatibor Voda and Metalac Gornji Milanovac.

Stadia

League table

Results

Top goalscorers
Including matches played on 16 May 2010; Sources: Superliga official website, soccerway.com

Hat-tricks

4 Player scored 4 goals

Awards

Player of the Year
The Player of the Year was awarded to Dragan Mrđa (FK Vojvodina).

Young Player of the Year
The Young Player of the Year was awarded to Saša Marković (OFK Beograd).

Team of the Year

Manager of the Year
The Manager of the Year was awarded to Zoran Milinković (FK Spartak).

Champion squad
 2009–10 FK Partizan season

Transfers
List of Serbian football transfers summer 2009
List of Serbian football transfers winter 2009–10

References

External links
 Official Site
 Tables and results at RSSSF

Serbian SuperLiga seasons
1
Serbia